The Oklahoma Department of Wildlife Conservation is an agency of the state of Oklahoma responsible for managing and protecting Oklahoma's wildlife population and their habitats. The Department is under the control of the Wildlife Conservation Commission, an 8-member board appointed by the Governor of Oklahoma with the approval of the Oklahoma Senate. All members serve eight-year terms. The Commission, in turn, appoints a Director to serve as the chief administrative officer of the Department.

The current Director of the Department of Wildlife Conservation is Richard Hatcher.

The Department was created in 1956 during the term of Governor Raymond D. Gary by an amendment to the Oklahoma Constitution.

History
The Department was created in 1956 when the voters of Oklahoma approved State Question 374, which amended the Oklahoma Constitution by adding Article 26. The State Question was brought before the voters of the state through an initiative petition process.

Leadership
The Department is overseen by the Oklahoma Secretary of Energy and Environment. Under Governor Kevin Stitt, Michael Teague is serving as the Secretary.

Organization
Wildlife Conservation Commission
Director
Assistant Director - Administration
Administration Division
Fiscal Services Section
Employee Services Section
Human Resources Section
Assistant Director - Operations
Fisheries Division
Wildlife Division
Information and Education Division
Law Enforcement Division
Federal Aid and Response Management Division

Staffing
The Wildlife Conservation Department, with an annual budget of over $40 million, is one of the larger employers of the State. For fiscal year 2010, the Department was authorized 339 full-time employees.

Fallen officers
Since the establishment of the Oklahoma Department of Wildlife Conservation, two officers have died while on duty.

See also

 List of law enforcement agencies in Oklahoma
 List of state and territorial fish and wildlife management agencies in the United States

References

External links
Official DWC Hunting Regulations
Official DWC Waterfowl Hunting Regulations
Official DWC Fishing Regulations

State law enforcement agencies of Oklahoma
Wildlife conservation organizations
1956 establishments in Oklahoma